= OU Center for Public Management =

The University of Oklahoma Center for Public Management(CPM) was established in 1994 on the Norman, Oklahoma campus as part of the OU College of Continuing Education's Public and Community Services Division.
